The Cassiporé River is a river of Amapá state in north-eastern Brazil.

Course

The Cassiporé river can be navigated by boats drawing under  as far as the village of Japa, 24 miles inland.
The Cassiporé River runs through the most northern part of the Amapá mangroves ecoregion along the bay where it flows into the Atlantic Ocean.

See also
List of rivers of Amapá
Vila Velha do Cassiporé, a village and Quilombo settlement on the river.

References

Sources

Rivers of Amapá